The Kembla Grange Classic, registered as the Keith F Nolan Classic, is an Illawarra Turf Club Group 3 Thoroughbred horse race, for three-year-old fillies, at set weights with penalties, over a distance of 1600 metres, held annually at Kembla Grange Racecourse in New South Wales, Australia in March. Total prize money for the race is A$200,000 including trophies.

History

The registered race is named after Keith F. Nolan, founding chairman of the Illawarra Turf Club and was instrumental in saving the Kembla Grange racecourse and establishing it as one of the premier provincial race tracks in New South Wales. The Illawarra Turf Club named a new grandstand after him - the Keith F. Nolan Stand - and named a feature race, the Keith F. Nolan Classic. Keith F. Nolan died in 2005 at the age of 76.

Name
 2003–2015 - Keith F Nolan Classic
 2016 - Arrowfield Kembla Grange Classic

Grade
 2003–2009 - Listed Race
 2010 onwards - Group 3

Venue
The 2011 race was run at Rosehill Gardens Racecourse after the scheduled race meeting at Kembla Grange was abandoned due to the track condition. 
The distance of the race at Rosehill was 1800 metres.

The 2022 race was run at Goulburn Racecourse.

Winners

 2023 - Pavitra
 2022 - Pretty Amazing
 2021 - Miravalle
 2020 - Asiago 
 2019 - Pohutukawa 
 2018 - Luvaluva 
 2017 - Dawn Wall
 2016 - Single Gaze
 2015 - Slightly Sweet
 2014 - Zanbagh
 2013 - Cameo
 2012 - Appearance
 2011 - Brazilian Pulse
 2010 - Slapstick
 2009 - Allez Wonder 
 2008 - Bernicia
 2007 - Hot Danish
 2006 - Pasikatera
 2005 - Ponte Piccolo
 2004 - La Nikita 
 2003 - Ain't Seen Nothin'

See also
 List of Australian Group races
 Group races

References

Horse races in Australia
Sport in New South Wales